The 2013–14 Kazakhstan Hockey Championship was the 22nd season of the Kazakhstan Hockey Championship, the top level of ice hockey in Kazakhstan. 10 teams participated in the league, and Yertis Pavlodar won the championship for the 2nd time in its history.

Regular season

Playoffs

External links
 Official website

References 

Kaz
Kazakhstan Hockey Championship seasons
1